Christofer Blomstrand (born 9 December 1991) is a Swedish professional golfer.

Blomstrand played on the Nordic Golf League in 2015, winning the Race to Himmerland in October. He earned his 2016 Sunshine Tour card through qualifying school. He won the 2016 Zambia Sugar Open on the Sunshine Tour in April. He tied for 25th at qualifying school to capture the last available card for the 2018 European Tour, where he saw immediate success at Joburg Open, finding himself sole second after a third round of 62, and later in the year he finished runner-up at Porsche European Open, one stroke behind.

Professional wins (4)

Sunshine Tour wins (1)

Nordic Golf League wins (2)

MENA Tour wins (1)

See also
2017 European Tour Qualifying School graduates

References

External links

Swedish male golfers
Sunshine Tour golfers
European Tour golfers
1991 births
Living people
21st-century Swedish people